Andrés Torres may refer to:
 Andrés Torres (baseball) (born 1978, American baseball center fielder
 Andrés Torres (cyclist) (born 1966), Guatemalan cyclist
 Andrés Torres (boxer) (born 1948), Puerto Rican boxer
 Andrés Torres (producer) (born 1987), Colombian record producer and drummer 
 Andrés Torres Queiruga (born 1940), Galician theologian, writer and translator
 Andrés Felipe Torres (born 1975), Colombian sports shooter